James Purdon Martin  (1893–1984) was a British neurologist.

Biography
After education at the Royal Belfast Academical Institution, J. Purdon Martin matriculated in 1912 at Queen's University Belfast and graduated there in with BA in 1915 and MA in 1918. During WWI he attempted to enlist in the British Army but he was graded as medically unfit because of his severe psoriasis. He graduated MB BCh BAO in 1920 and MD in 1922. He held a house appointment in Liverpool for about a year and then in March 1921 joined the staff of London's National Hospital for Nervous Diseases. There he was appointed to the consultant staff in 1925 and was dean of the medical school from 1944 to 1948. He qualified MRCP in 1922 and was elected FRCP in 1930. He was appointed to the consultant staffs of several hospitals in London. During WWII he was neurologist to Eastern Command.
J. Purdon Martin gave the Lumleian lectures in 1947 on Consciousness and its disturbances considered from the neurological aspect  and in 1963 the Arris and Gale lecture on Basal ganglia and locomotion. He was joint editor of Neurology for a number of years. For the academic year 1959–1960 he was a visiting professor at the University of Colorado Denver.

Martin's book The Basal Ganglia and Posture (1967) includes case histories and clinical observations of a large group of patients with post-encephalitic Parkinsonism who were long-stay patients at Highlands Hospital, Winchmore Hill.

There were two sons from his first marriage. There were no children from his second marriage.

Selected publications
with J. G. Greenfield: 

with N. S. Alcock: 

with Denis Williams: 
with H. L. Sheehan: 

with H. L. Sheehan:

References

External links
 (See also Awakenings.)

1893 births
1984 deaths
20th-century British medical doctors
British neurologists
Neurologists from Northern Ireland
People educated at the Royal Belfast Academical Institution
Alumni of Queen's University Belfast
Physicians of University College Hospital
Fellows of the Royal College of Physicians